Joyce M. Broadsword (born June 18, 1958, in Sandpoint, Idaho) served as a Republican Idaho State Senator from 2004 to 2012 representing the 2nd District.

Early life and career 
Broadsword attended Sandpoint High School and graduated in 1976. She and her husband John have been married for more than 30 years, are the parents of three children: Brian, Andrew, and J.C., and have 7 
grandchildren.

She has owned Northern Log Homes since 1978, Contracted Courier Service since 1993, B&B Builders since 2001, and was an executive of Downtown Sandpoint Business Association in 2004. She was a volunteer for Larry Craig for Senate in 1990, 1996, and 2002. She was a volunteer for Dirk Kempthorne for governor in 1998 and 2002. She was City coordinator for Butch Otter for Idaho Campaign in 2002.

Broadsword accepted the position of North Idaho Regional Director for the Department of Health and Welfare in 2013.

Committees 
 Finance, member
 Finance Appropriations, member
 Health and Welfare, vice chair
 Transportation, member
 Member, 2010 Olympic Committee, 2006–present
 Senate representative, board of directors, Idaho Rural Partnerships
 Alternate delegate, Pacific Northwest Economic Region
 Senate representative, Western Legislative Forestry Task Force

Organizations 
Her involvement with organizations has included:
 President, Kootenai Better Community, 1990–present
 President/chair, Idaho Women in Timber, 1996–2001
 Chair, Federated Women in Timber, 2002–2003
 Treasurer, Idaho Women in Timber, Bonner Chapter, 2002–present
 Secretary, Rotary Club of Sandpoint, 2004–present

References

External links
Idaho Legislature - Senator Joyce  M.  Broadsword official government website
broadsword4idaho.com official campaign website
Project Vote Smart - Senator Joyce M. Boadsword profile
Follow the Money - Joyce M. Broadsword
2010, 2008, 2006, 2004

1958 births
Living people
Republican Party Idaho state senators
People from Sandpoint, Idaho
Women state legislators in Idaho
21st-century American women